Ward Cove (also Wacker, Wacker City, or Wards Cove) is an unincorporated community in Ketchikan Gateway Borough, Alaska, United States. Its elevation is 164 feet (50 m).  It has a post office with the ZIP code 99928.

This village is an extension of the settlement area of Ketchikan northwest along the highway. A saltery was established in Ward Cove in 1883-84 by W. W. Waud. Eugene Wacker was first postmaster of the Wacker post office, which was established 1920. The post office name was changed to Wards Cove in 1951 and then to Ward Cove in 1954. The village population was 57 at the 1930 census.  The name "Ward Cove" was declared official in 1966 by the Board on Geographic Names.

The settlement lies on the northern shore of Ward Cove, at the southwestern end of Revillagigedo Island, 4 mi (7 km) northwest of Ketchikan.

Demographics

Ward Cove first appeared on the 1930 U.S. Census as the unincorporated village of "Wacker City." In 1940, the census bureau listed all settlements outside of the incorporated cities of Ketchikan and Saxman that could be reached by road on Revillagigedo Island as "Tongass Highway System", which had 494 residents. It did not report in 1950. In 1960, it returned as Wards Cove. In 1970, it was shortened to Ward Cove. In 1980, Ward Cove along with 6 other locales (Mud Bay, Peninsula Point, Port Higgins, Refuge Cove, Shoreline Drive & Tongass Highway System) were placed into the newly created census-designated place (CDP) of "North Tongass Highway", which had 1,722 residents. In 1990, it and all 6 other CDP's within Ketchikan Gateway Borough were dissolved (which contained 3,556 residents as of 1980). Aside from a southeastern portion of the former North Tongass Highway CDP being annexed into the city of Ketchikan, most of these locales, including Ward Cove, have not been counted within a city or CDP since 1980.

References

Populated coastal places in Alaska on the Pacific Ocean
Unincorporated communities in Ketchikan Gateway Borough, Alaska
Unincorporated communities in Alaska